Davus fasciatus, commonly known as the Costa Rican tiger rump, is a species of a new-world tarantula native to Costa Rica.

As pets
There is another species in the hobby often mis-sold under this name. Those as pets may be kept in terrariums. They require a 10-gallon to 15 gallon enclosure as adults and juveniles can be kept in much smaller containers like critter keepers or deli cups. Substrate should be 4 to 6 inches of a mixture of dryish soil/peat/etc. They should be kept around room temperature or slightly higher. Humidity should be low, although helpful to have a water source available or mist on occasion.

Feeding
Generally, in captivity, the species often sold as D. fasciatus or the synonym Cyclostermum fasciatum feed upon a variety of pesticide-free insects such as locusts, crickets and cockroaches. Spiderlings can be fed small 'pinhead' crickets, or scavenge the bodies of pre-killed crickets.

Reproduction
Females possess spermathecaes and males possess tibial hooks on the front pair of legs. Gestation period is about 6 to 8 months. The female produces an egg sac which contains between 200 - 800 eggs about a month after mating.

References 

 František Kovařík, Chov sklípkanů (Keeping tarantulas), Jihlava 2001
 http://care-sheet.com/index/Cyclosternum_fasciatum

Gallery 

Theraphosidae
Spiders of Central America
Spiders described in 1892